Oxystominidae is a family of nematodes belonging to the order Enoplida.

Genera

Genera:
 Angustinema Cobb, 1933
 Cricohalalaimus Bussau
 Halalaimus de Man, 1888

References

Nematodes